

Legend

List

References

1986-87